China National Machinery Industry Corporation (also known as Sinomach) is a Chinese conglomerate with businesses in tool making, construction equipment, agricultural equipment, and infrastructure construction. In two particular areas of construction engineering, the company is among the top in terms of revenue from international projects.  Based on 2013 rankings compiled by the Engineering News-Record, the company is the third largest contractor of power projects and 8th largest contractor of industrial projects.

A major subsidiary is the YTO Group, primarily a manufacturer of agriculture equipment.   In March 2011, YTO Group acquired McCormick France SAS, a French manufacturer of tractors, as part of strategy for entering the European tractor market.

Another major subsidiary of the company is the China Machinery Engineering Corporation (CMEC), a provider of engineering and construction services. The company expressed interest in building a 10,000 to 30,000 acre complex of industry, retail, and residential properties in the Boise area.  The plan is billed as a collaboration "on the reinvigoration of the American industrial base."

In June 2017, a sister SASAC-controlled conglomerate, China Hi-Tech Group Corporation (CHTC), became a wholly owned subsidiary of Sinomach through a restructuring, as part of a plan to reduce the number of SASAC directly controlled companies.

On April 6, 2017, Sinomach founded automotive company Zedriv. Zedriv makes 4 electric vehicles.

References

External links
Sinomach site

 
Construction equipment manufacturers of China
Manufacturing companies based in Beijing
Conglomerate companies of China
Companies established in 1997
Chinese brands
1997 establishments in China
Government-owned companies of China